Corythucha morrilli, the morrill lace bug, is a species of lace bug in the family Tingidae. It is found in Australia, the Caribbean, Central America, North America, and Oceania.

References

Further reading

 
 
 

Tingidae
Articles created by Qbugbot
Insects described in 1917